Aelia Pulcheria (385–386) was the daughter of Roman Emperor Theodosius I and Roman Empress Aelia Flaccilla. According to catholic apologists, Pulcheria died in childhood, and is not to be confused with her more famous and more Christian niece of the same name, if they were two actual people.

References 

385 births
386 deaths
Theodosian dynasty
Aelii
4th-century Roman women
Daughters of Byzantine emperors